Journey to the West is a Hong Kong television series adapted from the 16th-century novel of the same title. Starring Dicky Cheung, Kwong Wah, Wayne Lai and Evergreen Mak, the series was produced by TVB and was first broadcast on TVB Jade in Hong Kong in November 1996. A sequel, Journey to the West II, was broadcast in 1998, but the role of the Monkey King was played by Benny Chan instead, due to contract problems between Dicky Cheung and TVB. Cheung later reprised the role in another television series The Monkey King: Quest for the Sutra (2002), which was broadcast on TVB but not produced by the station.

Cast

Main cast
 Dicky Cheung as Sun Wukong
 Kwong Wa as Tang Sanzang
 Wayne Lai as Zhu Bajie
 Evergreen Mak as Sha Wujing
 Tong Chun-ming as White Dragon Horse

Other cast
 Note: Some cast members played multiple roles.

 Lee Lung-kei as Jade Emperor
 Angelina Lo as Queen Mother of the West
 Wah Chung-nam as Taishang Laojun
 Cheung Ying-choi as Taibai Jinxing
 Joe Ma as Erlang Shen
 Lee Wong-sang as Li Jing
 He Meitian as Nezha
 Chun Hung as Juling Shen
 Kwok Tak-shun as Old Man under the Moon
 Wong Man-biu as Barefoot Immortal
 Yau Biu as Duke of Thunder
 Marco Lo as Thousand Li Eye, Cowherd
 Luk Yuen-fan, Ng Lit-wah, Lulu Kai, Chan Chor-kiu, Wong Je-yi, Lee Bo-hin and Wong Chun-kam as Seven Fairies
 Ben Wong as Earth Deity
 Wu Yiu-fung as young Earth Deity
 Chor Yuen as Buddha
 Mimi Kung Chi Yan as Guanyin
 Ng Wai-san as Longnü
 Siu Cheuk-yiu, Doi Siu-man, Chu Lok-fai, Luk Hei-yeung as Four Heavenly Kings
 Chan Wing-chun as Lü Dongbin
 Mak Ka-lun as Lan Caihe
 Koo Ming-wah as Zhongli Quan
 Wong Wai-lam as Iron Crutch Li
 Leung Kin-ping as Royal Uncle Cao
 Lee Hoi-sang as Elder Zhang Guo
 Wong Wai-tak as Han Xiangzi
 Wong Fung-king as He Xiangu
 Chan Kwok-kuen as Ksitigarbha
 Cheng Ka-sang as King Yama
 Tang Yu-chiu as Hell Judge
 Chan Fung-bing as Meng Po
 Wong Wai as Subhuti
 Rebecca Chan as Princess Iron Fan
 Lee Si-yan as young Princess Iron Fan
 Gordon Liu as Bull Demon King
 Cheng Chung-hin as young Bull Demon King
 Lo Tze-lok as young Kitchen God
 Fong Kit as Night Patrol Deity, Village chief
 Chan Chung-tak as young Night Patrol Deity
 Lee Ying as Chang'e
 Lee Yiu-ging as Houyi
 Derek Kok as Wu Gang
 Wong Chun-ning as Marshal Tianpeng's deputy
 Cheung Hon-ban, Ng Man-sang as Monkeys
 Kiu Hung as Magician performer
 Tung Ngan as Little Demon
 Chung Wai-yi as Little Aunt
 Tam Yat-ching as Dragon King of the East Sea
 Cheung Hak as Third Dragon Prince
 Chan Min-leung as Turtle Immortal
 Cheng Pak-lun as Emperor Taizong of Tang
 Ho Pik-kin as Abbot
 Joseph Lee as Dragon King of Jing River
 Shek Wun as Turtle Chancellor
 Leo Tsang as Wei Zheng
 Cheung Jit, Zuki Lee, Wong Chun-kam as Devil Girls
 Ho Cheung-kwan, Eric Li, Wun Man-ying as Hell Guards
 Chan Hiu-wun as Ching-ching
 Ling Hon as Squire Gao
 Lily Liew as Mrs Gao, Queen of Xinglin
 Suen Kwai-hing, Lai Sau-ying as Gao family villagers
 Chan Chung-kin as Dragon King of the West Sea, Tie Yushu's father, King of Xinglin
 Maple Hui as Red Boy
 Michelle Fung as Jade Faced Vixen, Princess consort of Xinglin
 Akina Hong as Silver Fox
 Leung Suet-mei as Little Fox
 Kwan Ching as Dream Demon
 Damon Law, Lau Wing-chun as Dream Demon's minions
 Wang Kai-tak, Dai Yiu-ming as Red Boy's minions
 Lui Ying-yi as Chuntao
 Angela Tong as Weaver Girl
 Au Ngok as Village chief
 Chung Kit-yi as Ugly Girl, Spider Demon (Cuicui)
 Tang Yuk-wing as Yawang
 Lee Chi-wai, Leung Chiu-ho as Villagers
 Mariane Chan as White Bone Demon
 Edward Mok as Crown Prince Qianye
 Cheung Yuen-mei as Baihuaxiu
 Lo Kwok-wai as King of Baoxiang
 Wong Kin-fung as Guard commander
 Suen Yan-ming as Guard, Priest Chen
 Wun Seung-yin as Lady Mo
 Chan Po-ling as Zhenzhen, Spider Demon (Jingjing)
 Ho Mei-yu as Chuchu
 Lulu Kai as Lianlian
 Chan Yin-hong as Bai Susu
 Fung Sui-jan as Aunt Bai
 Lui Kim-kwong as Uncle Bai
 Lo Cheuk-nam as Prince of Loulan, Priest Li
 Andy Tai as Immortal of Tiger Power
 Lee Wai-man as Immortal of Elk Power
 Daniel Kwok as Immortal of Antelope Power
 Lau Kong as King of Chechi
 Lee Hung-kit as Abbot of Zhiyuan Monastery
 Chin Kar-lok as Centipede Demon / Song Yushu / Tie Yushu
 Angie Cheung as Spider Demon (Shishi)
 Law Lan as Spider Demon (Shishi and En'en's mother)
 Rain Lau as Spider Demon (En'en)
 Tang Lai-man as Spider Demon (Meimei)
 Tang Siu-chun as Rooster Demon
 Siu Yuk-yin as Flower Demon
 Suen Kwai-hing as Song Yushu and Shishi's teacher
 Wong Siu-lung as Song Yushu's classmate
 Cheng Lui as Travelling monk
 Lau Gwai-fong as Song Yushu's mother
 Lisa Lui as Ruler of Women's Kingdom
 Chan Pui-san as Princess of Women's Kingdom
 Kara Hui as Flying Tiger General
 Cheung Jit as Flying Bear General
 Chan Heung-ying as Flying Eagle General
 Tsang Wai-wun as Women's Kingdom official
 Joyce Chan as Bull Girl / Mingyue
 Yu Mo-lin as Imperial physician
 Ng Man-tat as Street Magician

External links
 

Journey to the West
Television shows based on Journey to the West
1990s Hong Kong television series
1996 Hong Kong television series debuts
1996 Hong Kong television series endings
Television about fairies and sprites
Demons in television